This list of museums in Leicestershire, England contains museums which are defined for this context as institutions (including nonprofit organizations, government entities, and private businesses) that collect and care for objects of cultural, artistic, scientific, or historical interest and make their collections or related exhibits available for public viewing. Also included are non-profit art galleries and university art galleries.  Museums that exist only in cyberspace (i.e., virtual museums) are not included.

Defunct museums
 City Gallery, Leicester, closed in 2010
 Snibston Discovery Museum, closed July 2015

See also

 :Category:Tourist attractions in Leicestershire

References
 Leicester Museums Service
 Museums in Leicestershire

 
Leicestershire
Museums